Dodgy Bastards is the twenty-third studio album by British folk rock band Steeleye Span. It was released in October 2016, and features several arrangements of the Child Ballads.

This was the first Steeleye Span album released following the departure of fiddle player Peter Knight, and the final album to feature bassist Rick Kemp.

Personnel
Steeleye Span
Maddy Prior – vocals
Jessie May Smart – violin, vocals
Rick Kemp – bass, vocals
Julian Littman – guitars, mandolin, keyboards, vocals
Spud Sinclair – guitars, vocals
Liam Genockey – drums, percussion

Track listing

References

Steeleye Span albums
2016 albums